Hokkaido Sapporo Kita High School (Hokkaidō Sapporo Kita Kōtō Gakkō) is a high school in Kita-ku, Sapporo, Hokkaidō, Japan, founded in 1902. It is one of the top high schools in Hokkaido.

The school is operated by the Hokkaido Prefectural Board of Education.

External links
 Sapporo Kita High School 

1902 establishments in Japan
Buildings and structures in Sapporo
High schools in Sapporo
Educational institutions established in 1902
Kita-ku, Sapporo